Clepsis clemensiana, Clemens' clepsis moth, is a species of moth of the family Tortricidae. It is found in North America, where it has been recorded from southern Canada, the north-eastern and north-western United States, as well as from northern Utah to northern California.

The length of the forewings is 9.6–11.2 mm. The ground colour of the forewings is straw yellow and the hindwings are white. Adults are on wing from June to September in two generations in the southern part of the range.

The larvae feed on Poaceae species, as well as on Aster, Symphyotrichum, Apocynum and Solidago species. They feed within silken tubes constructed on the blades of their host plant. The larvae are slender and have a pale yellow head.

Etymology
The species is named in honour of Dr. James Brackenridge Clemens, who collected the species.

References

Moths described in 1879
Clepsis